() is a shallow lake situated in an area of active volcanism in the north of Iceland, not far from Krafla volcano. It has a high amount of biological activity. The lake and the surrounding wetlands provides a habitat for a number of waterbirds, especially ducks.
The lake was created by a large basaltic lava eruption 2300 years ago, and the surrounding landscape is dominated by volcanic landforms, including lava pillars and rootless vents (pseudocraters). The effluent river   is known for its rich fishing for brown trout and Atlantic salmon.

The name  is sometimes used not only for the lake but the whole surrounding inhabited area.  The river , the lake  and the surrounding wetlands are protected as a nature reserve (the – Nature Conservation Area, which occupies ).

Since the year 2000, a marathon around the lake takes place in the summer.

Geography
The lake is unusually shallow, with an average depth of 2.5 metres and a maximum depth of 4.5 metres.

Climate
The  area features a tundra climate (Köppen climate classification: ET), bordering on a subarctic climate (Köppen climate classification: Dfc). Summers are typically cool with crisp nights while winters are very long and cold, but not severely cold.

Flora and fauna

Birds

The lake is fed by nutrient-rich springwater and has a high abundance of aquatic insects (Chironomidae) and Cladocera that form an attractive food supply for ducks. Fifteen species of ducks breed at the site, the largest such number in Europe. The duck species composition is unique, with a mixture of European and North American species, and also of boreal and arctic species. Most of the ducks are migratory, arriving in late April to early May from north-western Europe. The commonest species at the lake is the tufted duck with 6,000 pairs present, whilst the second most abundant species is the greater scaup with 1,500 pairs.

Other common species include the Barrow's goldeneye, 700 pairs of red-breasted merganser, 1000 pairs of Eurasian wigeon, around 300 pairs of gadwall, 200 pairs of mallard, around 350 pairs of common scoter, 150 pairs of long-tailed duck and 75 pairs of Eurasian teal. The northern shoveler and  northern pintail also regularly breed at the lake, albeit in smaller numbers, whilst common pochard used to breed regularly, but they have not done so regularly since the 1950s. The Barrow's goldeneye and the harlequin duck are both nearctic duck species. The population of the Barrow's goldeneye (of about 2000 individuals) relies entirely on the habitat provided by the   water system and its surrounding lava fields. Most of the Barrow's goldeneyes overwinter there, using ice-free areas kept open by emerging spring water (both warm and cold) and in the strong river current. This species is a hole-nester, in North America using tree-holes, but at  the birds use cavities in the lava for nesting. The other duck species nest abundantly in the numerous islands of the lake and the surrounding marshlands.

Other common waterbirds include the Slavonian grebe, red-necked phalarope, great northern diver, red-throated diver and whooper swan.  The lake is included in an important bird area.

Bird populations have been monitored annually since 1975 by the  Research Station. There is a long tradition of harvesting duck eggs for home use on the local farms. To ensure sustainability, the harvesting follows strict age-old rules of leaving at least four eggs in a nest for the duck to incubate.

The lava flows and moorlands surrounding the lake are home to rock ptarmigans and occasionally gyr falcons may be present.

Plants
 is one of the few places in the world where marimo grows naturally. Also known as Cladophora ball it is a species of filamentous green algae. Due to environmental factors their population has rapidly declined and the algae appeared to have become extinct in 2013. The ecosystem is now improving and small marimo balls are forming again.

Volcanism 

 was created about 2300 years ago by a large fissure eruption pouring out basaltic lava. The crater row that was formed on top of the eruptive fissure is called   (or  ) and has often been used as a textbook example of this type of volcanic activity. There was a large lake in the area at the time, a precursor of the present-day . When the glowing lava encountered the lake some of the water-logged lake sediment was trapped underneath it. The ensuing steam explosions tore the lava into small pieces which were thrown up into the air, together with some of the lake.

By repeated explosions in a number of locations, groups of craters built up and now dominate the landscape on the shore of Lake Mývatn and also form some of the islands in the lake. This type of lava formation is known as rootless cones or pseudocraters. Other rootless cone groups in this lava field are in the valley  and the plain . The formation of rootless cones halted the advance of the lava in some places creating temporary lava lakes. The lava eventually drained from the lakes, leaving behind a forest of rock pillars. The biggest of these formations is named . At another place, the pillars stand in the lake water. The lava created by the  eruption is known as the Younger  Lava.

The  district lies on the western border of the volcanic zone which cuts across north-eastern Iceland from north to south and is an extension of the Mid-Atlantic Ridge. All geological formations are quite recent, dating from the Ice Age and postglacial times.

Most of the mountains in the vicinity of the lake were formed by eruptions under the ice sheet in the glacial periods of the Ice Age. Eruptions that melted their way up through the ice formed table mountains, those which didn't formed hyaloclastite ridges.

At the close of the Ice Age, about 10,000 years ago, the  basin was covered by a glacier which pushed up huge end moraines which can still be seen at the north end of the lake. After the glacier started melting, a glacial lake was dammed up in the  depression until the glacier retreated from the present course of  river.

Postglacial volcanism in the  district may be divided into three cycles. The   cycle commenced shortly after the close of the Ice Age. The explosion crater (tephra ring)  dates from this cycle. Its eruption was followed by a number of small fissure eruptions. This lava dammed up the first , which was about as large as the present lake.

The second volcanic cycle, the  cycle, began 2500 years ago with a gigantic but brief eruption, which formed the explosion crater (tephra ring)  (also named ). Approximately 200 years later a vast lava flow, the Younger  Lava, was erupted (see above).

The third volcanic cycle began with the   eruptions in 1724–1729 which commenced with an explosion that formed the crater lake  . The  eruptions are quite similar in character to the recent volcanic activity near  in 1975–1984. Inside the volcano resides a magma chamber from which molten magma periodically bursts into a swarm of fissures that cut through the volcano from north to south.

The recent activity was characterized by periods of slow land rise, interspersed by shorter periods of rapid subsidence, underground magma bursts, rifting, earthquakes and eruptions (nine in all). This is an excellent example of the process of continental drift in Iceland.  A central volcano and its associated fissure swarm is called a volcanic system.  The  volcanic system is one of several such systems which together form the volcanic zone of Iceland.

A few rhyolite mountains border the  central volcano.

Because of its volcanic origin, the lake was formerly mined for diatomite, but this ceased in 2004.

See also
Cladophora
Geography of Iceland
List of lakes of Iceland
Volcanism of Iceland

References

Bibliography
Einarsson, Á., Stefánsdóttir, G., Jóhannesson, H., Ólafsson, J.S., Gíslason, G.M., Wakana, I., Gudbergsson, G. and Gardarsson, A. 2004. The ecology of Lake Mývatn and the River Laxá: variation in space and time. Aquatic Ecology 38: 317–348.
Gardarsson, A. and Einarsson, Á. eds. 1991. Náttúra Mývatns. Hið íslenska Náttúrufræðifélag, Reykjavík. 372 pp. (in Icelandic)
Gardarsson, A. and Einarsson, Á. 2000. Monitoring waterfowl at Mývatn, Iceland. Pp. 3–20 in F.A. Comin, J.A. Herrera-Silveira and J.Ramirez-Ramirez (eds.): Limnology and Aquatic birds. Monitoring, Modelling and Management. Universidad Autonoma de Yucatán, Mérida, Yucatán, Mexico.
Gíslason, G.M. 1994. River management in cold regions: a case study of the River Laxá, North Iceland. Pp. 464–483 in: The Rivers Handbook. Hydrological and Ecological Principles. Vol. 2. Eds. P. Calow & G.E. Petts. Blackwell, Oxford. 483 pp.
Jónasson, P.M. ed. 1979. Ecology of Eutrophic, Subarctic Lake Mývatn and the River Laxá. Oikos 32.

Notes

External links 

Geological map
A complete bibliography on the natural history of Mývatn
Current seismic activity at Mývatn
Lake Myvatn images
Facts and photos
Seacology Lake Myvatn Project Seacology
Mývatn panoramic virtual tour
Mývatn Private Day Tour

1724 in Europe
Birdwatching sites
Important Bird Areas of Iceland
Lakes of Iceland
Lava dammed lakes
North Iceland
North Volcanic Zone of Iceland
Ramsar sites in Iceland
Rift lakes of Iceland